WDMC (920 kHz) is a listener-supported AM radio station broadcasting a Catholic religious format. It is licensed to Melbourne, Florida, and serves the Space Coast.  It is owned by Divine Mercy Communications.  Most of the programming comes from the EWTN Radio Network.  The station makes appeals to its listeners to support its ministry with donations.

By day, WDMC is powered at 8,000 watts.  But to protect other stations on 920 AM, it reduces power to 4,000 watts at night.  It uses a directional antenna at all times.  The transmitter is on Eau Gallie Boulevard in Melbourne.

History
On , the station first signed on the air.  For most of its years on the air, the station had the call sign WMEL, standing for its city of license, MELbourne.  It had a middle of the road format of popular music, news and sports.  It was a network affiliate of CBS Radio News.

References

External links
FCC History Cards for WDMC
 The Florida Catholic: "Tune in new Catholic radio: WDMC 920 AM" (4/18/2008)

Catholic radio stations
Radio stations established in 1978
1978 establishments in Florida
DMC